SMS from another World is an Iranian Comedy series. The series is directed by Siroos Moghaddam.

Storyline 
This series is about a swindler and miser named Mansour Simkhah that to escape from the creditors, while creating a fictitious lawsuit, he pretends to be dead! Everyone thinks he is dead and is buried, this is the beginning of the story...

Cast 
 Mohammad-Reza Sharifinia
 Afsaneh Bayegan
 Afshin Sangchap
 Hamed Komaily
 Hamid Lolayi
 Reza Shafiei Jam
 Shila Khodadad
 Nader Soleimani
 Soroosh Goodarzi
 Ramin Rastad
 Shohreh Lorestani
 Giti Ghasemi
 Ezzatollah Mehravaran
 Reza Banafshekhah
 Dariush Salimi
 Manoochehr Azari
 Abbas Jamshidifar
 Karim Ghorbani
 Soosan Maghsoodloo

References

External links
 

Iranian television series
2000s Iranian television series